Edith the Fair ("Edyth the Gentle Swan"; born c. 1025), also known as Edith Swanneck, one of the wealthiest magnates in England on the eve of the Norman conquest, may also have been the first wife of King Harold Godwinson. "Swanneck" (or Swan-Neck) comes from the folk etymology which made her in Old English as swann hnecca, "swan neck", which was actually most likely a corrupted form of swann hnesce, "Gentle Swan" . She is sometimes confused with Ealdgyth, daughter of Earl Ælfgar of Mercia, who was queen during Harold's reign.

Marriage

Edith may have been the mother of Harold's daughter Gunhild of Wessex, who became the mistress of Alan Rufus, and Gytha of Wessex, who was taken by her grandmother to Denmark in 1068. Gytha was addressed as "princess" and married the Grand Duke of Kiev, Vladimir II Monomakh.

In a 2015 monograph, historian Bill Flint claims that Edith Swanneshals and Harold were legitimately married. Flint overturns many previous assumptions made about Edith's relationship with Harold, including the fidelity of the couple's marital union and Christian devotion. Flint argues that Edith and Harold were almost certainly married more danico: the Danish hand-fast marriage custom. As evidence for this, he cites a number of dowry bequests that were made at the time of Edith's union to Harold. Flint notes that the bequests made included Walsingham Manor, making Edith in all probability "the lady of the manor" during the year of 1061, which was identified by Tudor historian Richard Pynson as the year of the foundation of the shrine of Our Lady of Walsingham. Flint claims that the union more danico of Edith and Harold is legitimate from a Catholic perspective, arguing: "The changes confirming the Sacramental nature of Christian marriage had only recently been promulgated from Rome. Throughout the Danelaw and widespread among the nobility of England who now had many such Scandinavian bloodlines, the hand-fast marriage, which was customary and widely accepted throughout northern Europe, should not be referred to as an illegitimate union." (p. 9). In fact, the Anglo-Saxons had practiced hand-fast marriage long before Danish conquest.

Though Harold is said to have lawfully married Ealdgyth, the daughter of Earl Ælfgar, the widow of the Welsh ruler Gruffydd ap Llywelyn whom he had defeated in battle, that marriage in spring 1066 is seen by most modern scholars as one of political convenience. Mercia and Wales were allied against England, and the marriage gave the English claim in two very troublesome regions, and also gave Harold Godwinesson a marriage deemed "legitimate" by the clergy, unlike his longtime common law marriage with Edith the Fair.

Walsingham visionary
Flint identifies Edith as the visionary known colloquially as "Rychold" or "Richeldis de Faverches", who authored Our Lady of Walsingham.  The identification of Edith as the Walsingham visionary is rooted in his belief that the earlier date of the shrine's foundation, given by Richard Pynson as 1061, is credible. Pynson's history, which is given in a narrative poem known as the Pynson Ballad, had been previously thrown out by historians on the grounds it was unreliable as an oral narrative, but Flint defends the ballad on the grounds that Pynson was a respected historian, employed by King Henry VII, who also collaborated with John Leland. Flint contests the theories of J.C. Dickinson (1959) on the grounds that the 1131 Norfolk Roll, which Dickinson claims refers to the foundation of the shrine, actually refers to the foundation of the Priory of the Austin Friars, which preceded the foundation of the Walsingham Shrine (see p. xxii). He also notes that Edith Swanneshals was known within the court as "Rychold", meaning "fair and rich", and the appellatory title given by Pynson could therefore refer to the Anglo-Saxon Queen—a reference which is consistent with the original date given in the Pynson Ballad as 1061, for Edith Swaneshals was the Lady of the Walsingham Manor in this period (p. xxvii). Flint therefore establishes Edith Swaneshals as a Christian queen and the legitimate spouse of Harold Godwinson; as well as defending her Christian character as the probable visionary of the Shrine of Walsingham. In defending Edith's Christian character Flint cites her friendship with Wulfstan of Worcester.

Folklore
According to folklore, Edith identified Harold's body after the Battle of Hastings. The body was horribly mutilated after the battle by the Norman army of William the Conqueror, and, despite pleas by Harold's mother, Gytha Thorkelsdóttir, for William to surrender Harold's body for burial, the Norman army refused, even though Harold's mother offered Harold's weight in gold. It was then that Edith the Fair walked through the carnage of the battle so that she might identify Harold by markings on his chest known only to her. It was because of Edith the Fair's identification of Harold's body that Harold was given a Christian burial by the monks at Waltham Abbey. This legend is recounted in the well-known poem by Heinrich Heine, "The Battlefield of Hastings" (1855), which features Edith the Fair (as Edith Swan-Neck) as the main character and claims that the "marks known only to her" were love bites.

Notes

Citations

Sources
 A History of Britain: At the Edge of the World, 3500 BC - 1603 AD by Simon Schama, BBC/Miramax, 2000 
Edith the Fair, Bill Flint, 2015, Gracewing Press 
  The German Classics of the Nineteenth and Twentieth Centuries, Volume 06: Masterpieces of German Literature Translated into English in Twenty Volumes by Kuno Francke 
 Great Tales from English History: The Truth About King Arthur, Lady Godiva, Richard the Lionheart, and More by Robert Lacey, 2004  
 House of Godwine: The History of Dynasty by Emma Mason, 2004 
 Ancestral Roots of Certain American Colonists Who Came to America Before 1700 by Frederick Lewis Weis, Lines: 176–2, 176A-4, 177-1
  'Who Was Eddeva?' by J.R. Boyle, F.S.A.; Transactions of East Riding Antiquarian Society, Volume 4  (1896); pages 11–22

Anglo-Norse women
1020s births
1060s deaths
Year of birth uncertain
Year of death uncertain
House of Godwin
Anglo-Saxon royal consorts
11th-century English people
11th-century English women
Women in medieval European warfare
People from Walsingham